Alexander Atkinson Lawrence Jr. (December 28, 1906 – August 20, 1979) was a United States district judge of the United States District Court for the Southern District of Georgia.

Education and career

Born in Savannah, Georgia, Lawrence received an Artium Baccalaureus degree from the University of Georgia in 1929 and read law to enter the bar in 1930. He was in private practice in Savannah from 1931 to 1968.

Federal judicial service

On July 17, 1968, Lawrence was nominated by President Lyndon B. Johnson to a seat on the United States District Court for the Southern District of Georgia vacated by Judge Francis Muir Scarlett. Lawrence was confirmed by the United States Senate on July 25, 1968, and received his commission the same day. He served as Chief Judge from 1970 to 1976, assuming senior status on August 2, 1978, and serving in that capacity until his death on August 20, 1979, in Savannah.

References

Sources
 

1906 births
1979 deaths
Judges of the United States District Court for the Southern District of Georgia
United States district court judges appointed by Lyndon B. Johnson
20th-century American judges
20th-century American lawyers
United States federal judges admitted to the practice of law by reading law